is a Japanese women's professional shogi player ranked 1-dan. Her older sister Kana is also a women's professional shogi player.

Early life
Kawamata was born on April 28, 1996, in Izumo, Shimane. She became interested in because her older brother and older sister both played the game. 

In August 2011 when she was a third-grade junior high school student, Satomi finished third in the 3rd . The following year, she was accepted into Japan Shogi Association (JSA) Kansai Branch's training group system. She was awarded the provisional women's professional rank of 3-kyū in February 2016 under the sponsorship of shogi professional , and obtained the rank of women's professional 2-kyū and full women's professional status two months later in April 2016.

Women's shogi professional

Promotion history
Kawamata's promotion history is as follows:
 3-kyū: February 22, 2016
 2-kyū: April 27, 2016
 1-kyū: July 4, 2016
 1-dan: April 1, 2017

Note: All ranks are women's professional ranks.

Personal life
Kawamata and her sister Kana are the third pair of sisters to be awarded women's professional shogi status by the JSA.

At the end of March 2022, the Japan Shogi Association announced that Kawamata had gotten married and would be no longer competing under her maiden name "Satomi".

References

External links
 ShogiHub: Satomi, Saki

Japanese shogi players
Living people
Women's professional shogi players
Professional shogi players from Shimane Prefecture
People from Shimane Prefecture
1996 births